In experimental atomic physics, saturated absorption spectroscopy or Doppler-free spectroscopy is a set-up that enables the precise determination of the transition frequency of an atom between its ground state and an optically excited state. The accuracy to which these frequencies can be determined is, ideally, limited only by the width of the excited state, which is the inverse of the lifetime of this state. However, the samples of atomic gas that are used for that purpose are generally at room temperature, where the measured frequency distribution is highly broadened due to the Doppler effect. Saturated absorption spectroscopy allows precise spectroscopy of the atomic levels without having to cool the sample down to temperatures at which the Doppler broadening is no longer relevant (which would be on the order of a few millikelvins). It is also used to lock the frequency of a laser to the precise wavelength of an atomic transition in atomic physics experiments.

Doppler broadening of the absorption spectrum of an atom

According to the description of an atom interacting with the electromagnetic field, the absorption of light by the atom depends on the frequency of the incident photons. More precisely, the absorption is characterized by a Lorentzian of width Γ/2 (for reference, Γ ≈ 2π×6 MHz for common Rubidium D-line transitions). If we have a cell of atomic vapour at room temperature, then the distribution of velocity will follow a Maxwell–Boltzmann distribution

According to the Doppler effect formula in the case of non-relativistic speeds,

where  is the frequency of the atomic transition when the atom is at rest (the one which is being probed). The distribution of absorption as a function of the pulsation will therefore be proportional to a Gaussian with full width at half maximum

For a Rubidium atom at room temperature,

Therefore, without any special trick in the experimental setup probing the maximum of absorption of an atomic vapour, the uncertainty of the measurement will be limited by the Doppler broadening and not by the fundamental width of the resonance.

Principle of saturated absorption spectroscopy

To overcome the problem of Doppler broadening without cooling down the sample to millikelvin temperatures, a classical—and rather general—pump-probe scheme is used. A laser with a relatively high intensity is sent through the atomic vapor, known as the pump beam. Another counter-propagating weak beam is also sent through the atoms at the same frequency, known as the probe beam. The absorption of the probe beam is recorded on a photodiode for various frequencies of the beams.

Although the two beams are at the same frequency, they address different atoms due to natural thermal motion. If the beams are red-detuned with respect to the atomic transition frequency, then the pump beam will be absorbed by atoms moving towards the beam source, while the probe beam will be absorbed by atoms moving away from that source at the same speed in the opposite direction. If the beams are blue-detuned, the opposite occurs.

If, however, the laser is approximately on resonance, these two beams address the same atoms, those with velocity vectors nearly perpendicular to the direction of laser propagation. In the two-state approximation of an atomic transition, the strong pump beam will cause many of the atoms to be in the excited state; when the number of atoms in the ground state and the excited state are approximately equal, the transition is said to be saturated. When a photon from the probe beam passes through the atoms there is a good chance that, if it encounters an atom, the atom will be in the excited state and will thus undergo stimulated emission, with the photon passing through the sample. Thus, as the laser frequency is swept across the resonance, a small dip in the absorption feature will be observed at each atomic transition (generally hyperfine resonances). The stronger the pump beam, the wider and deeper the dips in the Gaussian Doppler-broadened absorption feature become. Under perfect conditions, the width of the dip can approach the natural linewidth of the transition.

A consequence of this method of counter-propagating beams on a system with more than two states is the presence of crossover lines. When two transitions are within a single Doppler-broadened feature and share a common ground state, a crossover peak at a frequency exactly between the two transitions can occur. This is the result of moving atoms seeing the pump and probe beams resonant with two separate transitions. The pump beam can cause the ground state to be depopulated, saturating one transition, while the probe beam finds much fewer atoms in the ground state because of this saturation and its absorption falls. These crossover peaks can be quite strong, often stronger than the main saturated absorption peaks.

Experimental realization

As the pump and the probe beam must have the same exact frequency, the most convenient solution is for them to come from the same laser.  The probe beam can be made of a reflection of the pump beam passed through neutral density filter to reduce its intensity.  To fine-tune the frequency of the laser, a diode laser with a piezoelectric transducer that controls the cavity wavelength can be used.  Due to photodiode noise, the laser frequency can be swept across the transition and the photodiode reading averaged over many sweeps.

In real atoms, there are sometimes more than two relevant transitions within the sample's Doppler profile (e.g. in alkali atoms with hyperfine interactions). This will generate the apparition of other dips in the absorption feature due to these new resonances in addition to crossover resonances.

References
 Saturated Absorption Spectroscopy of Rubidium 

Atomic physics
Spectroscopy